Ryan Pettinella (born July 12, 1984) is a retired American-Italian professional basketball player. He stands 6'9" tall, weighs 245 lbs, and played as a forward-center. He played in the Italian Lega Basket Serie A with Premiata Montegranaro and was a two-time national champion with Icelandic club UMF Grindavík.

High school

Pettinella graduated in 2003 from McQuaid Jesuit High School. He earned New York All-State selections for basketball in both his junior and senior year. During his senior season Pettinella led McQuaid Jesuit to the New York Class A State Championship, a 27-1 record, and a third ranking nationally in the USAToday poll.

College

Upon graduation, Pettinella enrolled at The Wharton School, University of Pennsylvania where he played two years for head coach Fran Dunphy before transferring to the University of Virginia. At Penn he helped lead the Quakers to an Ivy League Championship in 2005. The following year Pettinella transferred to Virginia where he played his final two seasons with the Cavaliers.  In 2007 the Cavaliers won the ACC Regular Season Championship. Pettinella achieved a degree in political science and foreign affairs.

Professional career

After graduating from Virginia in 2008, Pettinella signed with Premiata Montegranaro of the Italian Lega Basket Serie A. The following season, Ryan played in Spain for Ciudad de Vigo Básquet.

In 2010 Pettinella signed with UMFG Grindavík of the Icelandic Úrvalsdeild karla. He continued the following two seasons with Grindavik winning back to back national championships.

In August 2013, Pettinella returned to Italy joining Basket Recanati of the Italian Serie A2 Basket.

References

External links
 Icelandic statistics at kki.is
 Virginia Cavaliers bio at virginiasports.com
 Sutor Montegranaro Profile (Archived)
 Spanish statistics at competiciones.feb.es

1984 births
Living people
American expatriate basketball people in Iceland
American expatriate basketball people in Italy
American expatriate basketball people in Spain
American people of Italian descent
Basketball players from New York (state)
Ciudad de Vigo Básquet players
Grindavík men's basketball players
Penn Quakers men's basketball players
Power forwards (basketball)
Sportspeople from Rochester, New York
Úrvalsdeild karla (basketball) players
Virginia Cavaliers men's basketball players
American men's basketball players